Juicio Final (1997) (Spanish for "Final Judgement" 1997) was a professional wrestling supercard show, scripted and produced by Consejo Mundial de Lucha Libre (CMLL), which took place on December 5, 1997, in Arena México, Mexico City, Mexico. The show served as the year-end finale for CMLL before Arena México, CMLL's main venue, closed down for the winter for renovations and to host  Circo Atayde . The shows replaced the regular Super Viernes ("Super Friday") shows held by CMLL since the mid-1930s.

The main event of the show was the finals of a several weeks long La Copa Victoria tournament which saw Atlantis defeat Blue Panther two falls to one to win the tournament. On the undercard the team of Black Warrior and El Hijo del Santo defeated the team of Los Revolucionaries (El Felino and Negro Casas) as well as Scorpio Jr. and a partner. The show featured three additional matches.

Production

Background
For decades Arena México, the main venue of the Mexican professional wrestling promotion Consejo Mundial de Lucha Libre (CMLL), would close down in early December and remain closed into either January or February to allow for renovations as well as letting Circo Atayde occupy the space over the holidays. As a result CMLL usually held a "end of the year" supercard show on the first or second Friday of December in lieu of their normal Super Viernes show. 1955 was the first year where CMLL used the name "El Juicio Final" ("The Final Judgement") for their year-end supershow. It is no longer an annually recurring show, but instead held intermittently sometimes several years apart and not always in the same month of the year either. All Juicio Final shows have been held in Arena México in Mexico City, Mexico which is CMLL's main venue, its "home".

Storylines

The 1997 Juicio Final show featured five professional wrestling matches scripted by CMLL with some wrestlers involved in scripted feuds. The wrestlers portray either heels (referred to as rudos in Mexico, those that play the part of the "bad guys") or faces (técnicos in Mexico, the "good guy" characters) as they perform.

The main event was the culmination of the La Copa Victoria tournament, a 16-man double-elimination tournament that started on October 31 and ran over five shows prior to the Juicio Final Show. The winners bracket was won by Blue Panther. while Atlantis overcame his first round loss to win the losers bracket.

La Copa Victoria winners brackets

La Copa Victoria winners brackets

Results

References

1997 in Mexico
1997 in professional wrestling
CMLL Juicio Final